Olivia Norris (born 17 September 1983) is a German female javelin thrower, who won an individual gold medal (52.03 m) at the 1st Youth World Championships - Bydgoszcz (Poland) .

References

External links

1983 births
Living people
German female javelin throwers